Anastasiya Sergeyevna Lysenko (also transliterated Anastasiia Serhiïvna, born 2 December 1995) is a Ukrainian weightlifter who competes in the +75 kg weight division. She won a silver medal at the 2015 European Championships and placed tenth at the 2016 Olympics. She took up weightlifting aged eight in Vuhledar.

In 2020, she won the silver medal in the women's +87kg event at the Roma 2020 World Cup in Rome, Italy.

References

External links

 
 
 
 

1995 births
Living people
Ukrainian female weightlifters
Olympic weightlifters of Ukraine
Weightlifters at the 2016 Summer Olympics
People from Vuhledar
European Weightlifting Championships medalists
Sportspeople from Donetsk Oblast
21st-century Ukrainian women